Desmometopa varipalpis is a species of freeloader fly in the family Milichiidae. It is found in Europe.

References

Milichiidae
Articles created by Qbugbot
Insects described in 1927